Tirunallur is a village in the Orathanadu taluk of Thanjavur district, Tamil Nadu, India.  The village is famous for the Kalyanasundaresar Temple, Nallur dedicated to Lord Shiva.

Location
The place is located 8 km away from Kumbakonam on the Kumbakonam- Tanjore road.  The temple is 3 km away from Sundaraperumal kovil and 1 km from Vazhapazhakadai.  The best mode is taking town buses from Kumbakonam or mini buses from Darasuram.  The Sundaraperumal kovil railway station is also close by to the temple.

Demographics 
As per the 2001 census, Tirunallur had a total population of 1779 with 844 males and 935 females. The sex ratio was 1108. The literacy rate was 57.23.

References 
 

Villages in Thanjavur district